Michelle Yeoh Choo Kheng  (born Yeoh Choo Kheng; ; 6 August 1962) is a Malaysian actress. Credited as Michelle Khan in her early films in Hong Kong, she rose to fame in the 1990s after starring in a series of Hong Kong action films where she performed her own stunts, such as Yes, Madam (1985), Magnificent Warriors (1987), Police Story 3: Supercop (1992), The Heroic Trio (1993), and Holy Weapon (1993).

After moving to the United States, Yeoh gained recognition for starring in the James Bond film Tomorrow Never Dies (1997) and in Ang Lee's martial arts film Crouching Tiger, Hidden Dragon (2000), for which she was nominated for the BAFTA Award for Best Actress in a Leading Role. For her role as an overwhelmed mother navigating the multiverse in Everything Everywhere All at Once (2022), she won the Academy Award for Best Actress, becoming the first Asian and the second non-white woman to win the award, and the first Malaysian to win an Academy Award in any category.

Yeoh's other works include Memoirs of a Geisha (2005), Sunshine (2007), The Mummy: Tomb of the Dragon Emperor (2008), Reign of Assassins (2010), Kung Fu Panda 2 (2011), and The Lady (2011), where she portrayed Aung San Suu Kyi. She played supporting roles in the romantic comedies Crazy Rich Asians (2018) and Last Christmas (2019), and the Marvel Cinematic Universe film Shang-Chi and the Legend of the Ten Rings (2021). On television, Yeoh has starred in Star Trek: Discovery (2017–2020) and The Witcher: Blood Origin (2022).

The film review aggregation website Rotten Tomatoes ranked her the greatest action heroine of all time in 2008. In 1997, she was chosen by People as one of the "50 Most Beautiful People in the World", and in 2009 the same magazine listed her as one of the "35 All-Time Screen Beauties". In 2022, Time named her one of the world's 100 most influential people on its annual listicle and its Icon of the Year.

Early life and education 
Yeoh was born on 6 August 1962 in Ipoh, Perak, to a  Malaysian Chinese family of Hokkien and Cantonese ancestry. Her parents are Janet Yeoh and Yeoh Kian-teik (died on 5 November 2014), a lawyer and Malaysian Chinese Association (MCA) politician. She grew up speaking Malay and English, and could not read or speak Cantonese very well. She expressed that
lack as her "greatest regret" in 2022. Despite that, she learned to speak Cantonese fluently in the 1980s and some Mandarin in the 2000s.

Yeoh was keen on dance from an early age, beginning ballet at the age of four. She studied at Main Convent Ipoh, an all-girls secondary school, as a primary student. At the age of 15, she moved with her parents to the United Kingdom, where she was enrolled in an all-girls boarding school. Yeoh later studied at the UK's Royal Academy of Dance in London, majoring in ballet. However, a spinal injury prevented her from becoming a professional ballet dancer, and she transferred her attention to choreography and other arts. She received a BA degree in creative arts with a minor in drama in 1982 from Crewe & Alsager College in Cheshire.

Career

Early career and first retirement (1983–1991)

In 1983, at the age of 20, Yeoh won the Miss Malaysia World contest. She was Malaysia's representative at Miss World 1983 pageant in London, where she placed 18th. Later that year, she traveled to Australia where she won the Miss Moomba International 1984 pageant. Her first acting work was in a television commercial for Guy Laroche watches with Jackie Chan. This caught the attention of a fledgling Hong Kong film production company, D&B Films. Although she had passive understanding of the Ipoh Cantonese spoken in her hometown, she could not speak it. During a phone call in Cantonese, she was offered to co-star in a television commercial with a Sing Long, and only realized that was Jackie Chan's Cantonese name when she arrived in studio. She learned to speak Cantonese as she began her career in Hong Kong.

Yeoh started her film career acting in action and martial arts films, where she did most of her own stunts. Already with her third credit, Yes, Madam (1985), she was given a main role. She was credited as Michelle Khan in these earlier films. This alias was chosen by D&B Films, who thought it might be more marketable to international and western audiences. Yeoh married Dickson Poon, who headed the D&B Group, in 1987 and retired from acting.

Return and establishment as action and martial arts star (1992–2001)

Yeoh returned to acting with Police Story 3: Super Cop (1992) after having divorced Poon. She appeared in The Heroic Trio (1993), and the Yuen Woo-ping films Tai Chi Master and Wing Chun in 1993 and 1994, respectively.

She changed her stage name back to Michelle Yeoh when she started her Hollywood career with Tomorrow Never Dies in 1997. In the 1997 James Bond film, she played Wai Lin opposite star Pierce Brosnan. Brosnan was impressed, describing her as a "wonderful actress" who was "serious and committed about her work". He referred to her as a "female James Bond" in reference to her combat abilities. She wanted to perform her own stunts but was prevented because director Roger Spottiswoode considered it too dangerous. Nevertheless, she performed all of her own fighting scenes. In 1997, she played Soong Ai-ling in the award-winning The Soong Sisters. Yeoh was approached by director Ang Lee to star as Yu Shu Lien in her first Mandarin-language martial arts film Crouching Tiger, Hidden Dragon (2000). She did not speak Mandarin until the 2000s, and she had to learn the Mandarin lines for Crouching Tiger, Hidden Dragon phonetically. The film was an international success, and earned Yeoh a BAFTA 2000 nomination for Best Actress in a Leading Role.

Career fluctuations (2002–2016)

In 2002, Yeoh produced her first English film, The Touch, through her own production company Mythical Films. In 2005, Yeoh starred as Mameha in the film adaptation of Memoirs of a Geisha, and she continued her English-language work in 2007 with Sunshine. In 2008, Yeoh starred in the fantasy action film The Mummy: Tomb of the Dragon Emperor with Brendan Fraser and Jet Li. In 2011, she portrayed Aung San Suu Kyi in Luc Besson's The Lady. Yeoh was blacklisted by the Burmese government allegedly because of her participation in The Lady; she was refused entry to Myanmar on 22 June 2011 and was deported on the same day.

In October 2011, Yeoh was chosen by Guerlain to be its skincare ambassador. Yeoh's role was to help strengthen the French cosmetics company's relationship with Asia.

Yeoh did not branch out into television until 2015, with her first role playing Mei Foster, wife to the British Ambassador to Thailand, who is secretly a North Korean spy named Li-Na, on the fifth season of the Cinemax/Sky series Strike Back.

Supporting roles (2017–2020)

In 2016, Yeoh was cast as Starfleet Captain Philippa Georgiou of the starship USS Shenzhou in the series Star Trek: Discovery, and recurs as Georgiou's "mirror" doppelganger later in the show. Yeoh went on to play the role for three seasons, garnering critical acclaim and becoming a fan favorite. Following the success of Star Trek: Discovery, a spinoff series with Yeoh in the leading role, was commissioned in 2019. The series, which would center on Yeoh's character, Emperor Georgiou working as a member of Section 31, a secret intergalactic spy organisation, is still "in development" as of January 2023.

In 2018, Yeoh played family matriarch Eleanor Young in Jon M. Chu's Crazy Rich Asians, a film adaptation of Kevin Kwan's book of the same name, opposite Constance Wu and Henry Golding. Carlos Aguilar of TheWrap described her performance as "convincingly subdued". In 2019, she played Christmas themed-store owner "Santa" in Last Christmas, opposite Henry Golding and Emilia Clarke. The film was released on 8 November 2019, and was a box office success grossing over $121 million worldwide.

Yeoh played Ying Nan in Marvel Studios' Shang-Chi and the Legend of the Ten Rings, directed by Destin Daniel Cretton. The film was released in theaters on 3 September 2021. It was announced at The Game Awards 2020 that Yeoh would star in Ark: The Animated Series, a series based on the video game Ark: Survival Evolved by Studio Wildcard, in which she plays the role of Meiyin Li, a 3rd century Chinese rebel leader, known as the Beast Queen.

Award success (2021–present)
In 2022, Yeoh starred in the science fiction surreal comedy film Everything Everywhere All at Once from filmmaking duo Daniels, released in March to critical acclaim. In the film, she played struggling laundromat owner Evelyn Wang, a role that was praised by critics, with David Ehrlich of IndieWire claiming it the "greatest performance that Michelle Yeoh has ever given". It was for this role that Yeoh earned her first Golden Globe win (becoming the first Malaysian actor to win Best Performance by an Actress in a Motion Picture – Musical or Comedy at the Golden Globes) her first Independent Spirit award and nomination, first Oscar nomination, her second BAFTA nomination, and her first Critics' Choice Awards nomination. Additionally, she became the first Asian woman to win any individual category in the Screen Actors Guild Awards, winning the Screen Actors Guild Award for Outstanding Performance by a Female Actor in a Leading Role. Yeoh is the first Malaysian to be nominated for and win an Academy Award, and the first Asian woman to win the Academy Award for Best Actress.

Yeoh is set to appear in the upcoming Disney+ series American Born Chinese, based on the book of the same name by Gene Luen Yang. In June 2022, it was announced that she will star in the eight-part series The Brothers Sun for Netflix.

She is also set to star in A Haunting in Venice directed by Kenneth Branagh and as Madame Morrible in the two-part film adaptation of the musical Wicked directed by Jon M. Chu.

Personal life 

Yeoh is Buddhist. She does not have any children.

Yeoh was married to Hong Kong entrepreneur Dickson Poon, owner of businesses such as Harvey Nichols and Charles Jourdan, from 1988 to 1992. In 1998, Yeoh was engaged to Alan Heldman, an American cardiologist. In 2004, she started dating Jean Todt, then the general manager and CEO of Scuderia Ferrari and later the president of the FIA. She lives in Geneva, Switzerland, with Todt.

In March 2008, she visited Vietnam to film a documentary for the Asian Injury Prevention Foundation. Yeoh is a patron of the Save China's Tigers project committed to protecting the endangered South China tiger. Yeoh's activism extends to health and well-being issues, ranging from AIDS to road safety, through organizations including Live to Love and American Foundation for AIDS Research (amfAR). Recently, her philanthropic efforts have involved wildlife advocacy and environmental conservation as a Goodwill Ambassador for the United Nations Development Programme (UNDP) and WildAid.

In 2022, she told Vanity Fair that Shakespeare and Stephen King were her favorite authors and that Tarzan was her favorite fictional hero.

Filmography

Awards, honors, and styles 

In 1999, she was a member of the jury at the 49th Berlin International Film Festival. On 19 April 2001, Yeoh was awarded the Darjah Datuk Paduka Mahkota Perak (DPMP), which carries the title Dato', by Sultan Azlan Shah, the Sultan of Perak, her home state, in recognition of the fame she brought to the state. On 25 November 2002, Yeoh was honored as The Outstanding Young People of the World (TOYP) (Cultural Achievement) by JCI (Junior Chamber International). On 23 April 2007, French President Jacques Chirac conferred upon Yeoh the title of Knight of the Legion of Honor. The decoration was presented to her in a ceremony in Kuala Lumpur on 3 October 2007. She was promoted to Officer of the same French Order by French President Nicolas Sarkozy on 14 March 2012 at a ceremony held at the president's residence, the Élysée Palace on that day, and promoted to Commander, the highest honour available to non-French citizens, by François Hollande at the official residence of the French Ambassador in Kuala Lumpur in 2017.

On 22 May 2012, Yeoh was awarded the Darjah Seri Paduka Mahkota Perak (SPMP) which carries the title Dato' Seri during the investiture ceremony in conjunction with the Sultan of Perak Sultan Azlan Shah's birthday. Yeoh received the Excellence in Asian Cinema award during the 7th Asian Film Awards in March 2013 in Hong Kong. On 1 June 2013, Yeoh was awarded the Panglima Setia Mahkota (PSM) which carries the title Tan Sri during the investiture ceremony in conjunction with the birthday of Yang di-Pertuan Agong Tuanku Abdul Halim Mu'adzam Shah. On 30 November 2013, Yeoh presided as the Chief Guest at the International Film Festival of India.

Yeoh was included in the BBC's 100 Women list of 2020. She was placed on Time magazine's list of the 100 most influential people in the world in 2022. On 13 August 2022, Yeoh received an honorary doctorate of fine arts degree from the American Film Institute for her contributions of distinction to the art of the moving image. She became the first Asian artist to receive the honor. On 9 December 2022, Yeoh received the Kirk Douglas Award from the Santa Barbara International Film Festival.

Honors 
 :
  Knight Commander of the Order of the Perak State Crown (DPMP) – Dato' (2001)
  Knight Grand Commander of the Order of the Perak State Crown (SPMP) – Dato' Seri (2012)
  Commander of the Order of Loyalty to the Crown of Malaysia (PSM) – Tan Sri (2013)
 :
  Knight of the National Order of the Legion of Honor (2007)
  Officer of the National Order of the Legion of Honor (2012)
  Officier of the National Ordre des Arts et des Lettres (2016)
  Commander of the National Order of the Legion of Honor (2017)

Awards and nominations

Special awards

See also
 List of Asian Academy Award winners and nominees

Notes

References

Further reading 
 Kho Tong Guan: Yeoh Chu Kheng, Michelle. In: Leo Suryadinata (ed.): Southeast Asian Personalities of Chinese Descent: A Biographical Dictionary, Volume I & II. Institute of Southeast Asian Studies, 2012, pp. 1347–1350
 Ken E. Hall: Michelle Yeoh. In: Garry Bettinson: Directory of World Cinema: CHINA 2. Intellect Books, 2015 , pp. 71–73
 Lisa Funnell: Warrior Women: Gender, Race, and the Transnational Chinese Action Star. Suny Press, 2014, pp. 31–57 (chapter Transnational Chinese Mothers: The Heroic Identities of Michelle Yeoh and Pei Pei Cheng)
 Rikke Schubart: Super Bitches and Action Babes: The Female Hero in Popular Cinema, 1970–2006. McFarland, 2012 , pp. 123–143 (chapter Beautiful Vase Made of Iron and Steel Michelle Yeoh)

External links 

 
 

1962 births
Living people
20th-century Malaysian actresses
21st-century Malaysian actresses
BBC 100 Women
Best Actress Academy Award winners
Best Musical or Comedy Actress Golden Globe (film) winners
Commandeurs of the Légion d'honneur
Commanders of the Order of Loyalty to the Crown of Malaysia
Malaysian beauty pageant winners
Malaysian born Hong Kong artists
Malaysian Buddhists
Malaysian emigrants to Hong Kong
Malaysian environmentalists
Malaysian expatriates in Hong Kong
Malaysian expatriates in the United Kingdom
Malaysian female dancers
Malaysian female models
Malaysian film actresses
Malaysian people of Cantonese descent
Malaysian people of Hokkien descent
Malaysian television actresses
Malaysian voice actresses
Malaysian women environmentalists
Miss World 1983 delegates
Officiers of the Ordre des Arts et des Lettres
Outstanding Performance by a Cast in a Motion Picture Screen Actors Guild Award winners
Outstanding Performance by a Female Actor in a Leading Role Screen Actors Guild Award winners
People from Ipoh
People from Perak
People with acquired permanent residency of Hong Kong